Health in Barbuda refers to the overall health of the population of the island of Barbuda. Barbuda has the highest rates of allergies, heart disease, and mental illness throughout the entire nation. Health in Barbuda is the responsibility of Barbuda's Public Health Department.

Statistics (2011) 

56.25% of the population is covered by a health insurance scheme, the highest amount in the nation.

References

Health in Antigua and Barbuda